The third series of Comedy Playhouse, the long-running BBC series, aired from 28 September 1963 to 31 January 1964.

Background
The third series, which was in black-and-white, consisted of seventeen episodes, each of which had a different cast and storyline. Two of the episodes made it to its own series, The Walrus and the Carpenter, and The Bed which became Meet the Wife.

Episodes

References
Mark Lewisohn, "Radio Times Guide to TV Comedy", BBC Worldwide Ltd, 2003
British TV Comedy Guide for Comedy Playhouse
Comedy Playhouse, a TV Heaven Review

Comedy Playhouse (series 3)